Liviu Tipuriţă is a Transylvanian-born British film director and producer. He has been nominated for an award by BAFTA.

Early life
Tipuriţă was born and grew up in Sibiu, Romania. He later moved to the UK to study filmmaking in Newcastle and Edinburgh.

Awards
In 2003, he won a George Polk Award for Television Reporting. He has won a National Headliners Award for Investigative Reporting, Erick and Amy Burger Award for Best International Reporting in the Broadcast Media Dealing with Human Rights (2003), Cine Golden Eagle Award/Investigative Category (2004), Foreign Press (FPA) Award for Best Documentary/TV Feature Story Of The Year (2009), Royal Television Society (RTS) Television Journalism Award/Current Affairs International Category, Prix Europa Special Commendation. (2010) Foreign Press (FPA) Award for Arts & Culture Story of the Year 2016, Special Award Astra Film Festival 2016  Impact Docs Award of Merit Special Mention 2017

Selected filmography
The New Gypsy Kings (2016)
Numbers Joe (2015)
Inside The Actors' Temple (2011)
Britain's Child Beggars (2011)
Gypsy Child Thieves (2009)
Rogue Restaurants (TV series, 2008)
Shoplifters Caught On Camera (2007)
Conning The Conmen (TV series, 2007)
Gypsy Witch (2006)
Behind Closed Doors (2005)
The Terror Suspect's Dad (2005)
Easy Prey (2004)
The Child Sex Trade (2003)
Weekend (1998)
Reflections (1993)

References

British filmmakers
George Polk Award recipients
Romanian expatriates in England
1969 births
Living people
People from Sibiu
Romanian film directors